Colin the Vet was a British comic strip series, originally published in the children's magazine The Beano between 2004 and 2006. The strip was drawn solely by Duncan Scott. As the name implies, the strip was about a veterinarian called Colin, who encounters all sorts of crazy animals. The title was a pun on the phrase 'call in the vet'.

It was one of the nominees to be voted into The Beano by readers in early 2004. Although Joe Jitsu won, it was only a 1% victory over Colin, so both were added to The Beano. Colin also appeared in the Beano Annuals for 2006 and 2007.

A running gag in his comic strips included hidden "Celebrity Pets", which are fictional pets owned by famous people. Many of the pets' descriptions are puns on the name of the celebrity. (Such as "Ant and Dec's Ant on decks")

Beano strips
British comics
Gag-a-day comics
2004 comics debuts
2006 comics endings
British comics characters
Male characters in comics
Fictional veterinarians
Comics about animals